Sowe may refer to:
Sowe (surname)
River Sowe in Warwickshire and West Midlands, England
Walsgrave on Sowe, West Midlands, a village